The 1990 SkyDome World Tennis Tournament was a men's tennis tournament played on indoor carpet courts. It was the 3rd edition of the event known that year as the SkyDome World Tennis Tournament (previously held twice in 1985 and 1986), and was part of the ATP Championship Series, double-week events of the 1990 ATP Tour, running concurrently with the 1990 Belgian Indoor Championships. It took place at the SkyDome in Toronto, Ontario, Canada, from February 12 to February 18, 1990. First-seeded Ivan Lendl won the singles title.

Finals

Singles

 Ivan Lendl defeated  Tim Mayotte, 6–3, 6–0
 It was Lendl's third singles title of the year, and the 86th of his career.

Doubles

 Patrick Galbraith /  David Macpherson defeated  Neil Broad /  Kevin Curren, 2–6, 6–4, 6–3
It was Galbraith's first doubles title of the year, and the second of his career. 
It was Macpherson's first doubles title of the year, and of his career.

References

External links
 ITF tournament edition details

SkyDome World Tennis Tournament
Toronto Indoor